Muzakhid Khabibulin (born 2 September 1933) is a Soviet speed skater. He competed in the men's 5000 metres event at the 1964 Winter Olympics.

References

1933 births
Living people
Soviet male speed skaters
Olympic speed skaters of the Soviet Union
Speed skaters at the 1964 Winter Olympics
Sportspeople from Perm, Russia